The Foundation for Personality and Social Psychology (abbreviated FPSP) is a New York-based non-profit charitable organization that funds research grants and awards to researchers in the fields of personality and social psychology. It was founded in 2006.

Awards
The FPSP funds and awards multiple annual awards to distinguished researchers in personality and social psychology. These awards include the following:
Caryl Rusbult Close Relationships Early Career Award (2011–present)
Heritage Dissertation Research Award (2008–present)
SAGE Young Scholars Awards (in conjunction with SAGE Publications) (2014–present)

References

External links

Non-profit organizations based in New York (state)
Organizations established in 2006
2006 establishments in New York City
Psychology organizations based in the United States
Medical and health foundations in the United States